The Seven Thousand Cadres Conference, or 7000 Cadres Conference, was one of the largest work conferences ever of the Chinese Communist Party (CCP) which took place in Beijing, China from 11 January - 7 February 1962. The conference was attended by over 7,000 party officials nationwide, focusing on the issues of the Great Leap Forward which resulted in the deaths of tens of millions in the Great Chinese Famine. CCP chairman Mao Zedong made self-criticism during the conference, after which he took a semi-retired role, leaving future responsibilities to Chinese President Liu Shaoqi and Vice Premier Deng Xiaoping.

The Conference 
The Conference took place in Beijing, China from 11 January - February 1962.

During the conference, Liu Shaoqi, the 2nd President of China and Vice Chairman of the Communist Party, delivered an important speech that formally attributed 30% of the famine to natural disasters and 70% to man-made mistakes, which were mainly the radical economic policies of the Great Leap Forward since 1958.

The policies of Mao Zedong were criticized, and Mao also made self-criticism as the conference promoted "criticism and self-criticism". CCP vice chairman Lin Biao, however, continued his praises of Mao at the conference. The conference promoted "democratic centralism" within the Communist Party.

Influence 
After the 7,000 Cadres Conference, Liu Shaoqi together with Deng Xiaoping, was in charge of most policies within the party and the government, while Mao took a semi-retired role.

The conference corrected some of the far-left economic policies. Economic reforms such as sanzi yibao which allowed free market and household responsibility for agricultural production were carried out by Liu Shaoqi, Deng Zihui and others. The reforms alleviated the economic difficulties after the Great Leap Forward to an extent.

Aftermath 

The conference revealed serious divisions within the party's top leadership between those who thoroughly endorsed the Three Red Banners and those who maintained doubts about them.

The disagreement between Mao and Liu (and Deng) became more and more apparent, especially on Mao's call to "never forget class struggle".

In August 1962, Mao emphasized during a meeting in Beidaihe that class struggle must be talked about "every year, every month and every day". Mao reinforced his point of view in September 1962 during a national conference of the Chinese Communist Party.

Mao also criticized the economic reforms carried out by Liu Shaoqi and others, even describing the reforms to foreign leaders as "attempts to undermine socialist collectivism and destroy socialism" in February 1964.

In 1963, Mao launched the nationwide Socialist Education Movement and in 1966, he launched the Cultural Revolution in order to return to the center of power, during which Liu was persecuted to death as a "traitor" as well as a "capitalist roader" and Deng was also purged (twice).

Lin Biao, on the other hand, was formally selected by Mao as his successor in 1969.

See also 

 Great Leap Forward
 Sino-Soviet Split
 Lushan Conference
 Great Chinese Famine
 Socialist Education Movement
 Cultural Revolution

References 

Cold War history of China
1962 in China
1962 conferences
January 1962 events in Asia
February 1962 events in Asia
Great Leap Forward
Assemblies of the Chinese Communist Party